The Indian vulture (Gyps indicus) is an Old World vulture native to India, Pakistan and Nepal. It has been listed as Critically Endangered on the IUCN Red List since 2002, as the population severely declined. Indian vultures died of kidney failure caused by diclofenac poisoning. It breeds mainly on hilly crags in central and peninsular India.

The  slender-billed vulture (Gyps tenuirostris) in the northern part of its range is considered a separate species.

Description

The Indian vulture is medium-sized and bulky. Its body and covert feathers are pale, its flight feathers are darker. Its wings are broad and its tail feathers are short. Its head and neck are almost bald, and its bill is rather long. As they are sexually dimorphic, males are larger than females.

It weighs . It is smaller and less heavily built than the Eurasian griffon. It is distinguished from that species by its less buff body and wing coverts. It also lacks the whitish median covert bar shown by griffons.

Behaviour and ecology

The Indian vulture breeds mainly on cliffs in South and Central India, but is known to use trees to nest in Rajasthan. It may also breed on high human-made structures, like the Chaturbhuj Temple. Like other vultures, it is a scavenger, feeding mostly from carcasses, which it finds by soaring over savannah and around human habitation. It often congregates in flocks.

Status and conservation

Population decline

The Indian vulture and the white-rumped vulture, G. bengalensis species have suffered a 99%–97% population decrease in Bangladesh, Pakistan and India. Between 2000-2007 annual decline rates of this species and the slender-billed vulture averaged over sixteen percent. The cause of this has been identified as poisoning caused by the veterinary drug diclofenac. Diclofenac is a non-steroidal anti-inflammatory drug (NSAID) and when given to working animals it can reduce joint pain and so keep them working for longer. The drug is believed to be swallowed by vultures with the flesh of dead cattle who were given diclofenac in their last days of life.

Diclofenac causes kidney failure in several species of vultures. In March 2006 the Indian Government announced its support for a ban on the veterinary use of diclofenac. Another NSAID, meloxicam, has been found to be harmless to vultures and should prove to be an acceptable substitute for diclofenac. A rise in the production of meloxicam can bring its cost down to diclofenac's own levels, and make it more suitable for use. As of August 2011, banning diclofenac for veterinary use for approximately a year did not prevent diclofenac's use across India. Small numbers of birds have bred across peninsular India, in Karnataka and Tamil Nadu, especially in villages around Bangalore. The decline in Indian vulture populations has drastically affected the conservation of the environment. By removing all carrion, vultures had helped decrease pollution, spread of diseases, and suppressed undesirable mammalian scavengers. In their absence, the population of feral dogs and rats, along with their zoonotic diseases, has increased greatly.

Captive-breeding programmes

Captive-breeding programmes for several species of Indian vulture have been started. The vultures are long lived and slow in breeding, so the programmes are expected to take decades. Vultures reach breeding age at about five years old. It is hoped that captive-bred birds will be released to the wild when the environment is clear of diclofenac.

In early 2014 the Saving Asia's Vultures from Extinction (Save) programme announced that it expects to start releasing captive-bred birds into the wild by 2016.

Two captive Himalayan griffons were released in June, 2016 from Jatayu Conservation Breeding Centre, Pinjore as part of Asia's first vulture re-introduction program.

References

External links 

 Conserving Asia's critically endangered vultures
 Vulture Territory Facts and Characteristics: Long Billed Griffon
 "Saving Asia's Vultures from Extinction" Consortium
 Conservation of Vultures in Konkan region

Indian vulture
Birds of prey of Asia
Indian vulture
Birds of Pakistan
Birds of Nepal
Indian vulture
Indian vulture
Aviculture